Teshikaga Airfield is an airstrip adjoining the town of Teshikaga in Hokkaido, Japan. 

It has a  gravel runway, a terminal building, and a large hangar. 

It is reported closed in 2009.

References

Defunct airports in Japan
Airports in Hokkaido